The Schuster Line was a line of barriers and barricades erected by the Luxembourg government along its borders with Germany and France shortly before World War II. The line was named after Joseph Schuster, Luxembourg's chief engineer of bridges and highways, who was responsible for its construction.

The Schuster Line consisted of 41 sets of concrete blocks and iron gates; 18 bridgeblocks on the German border, and five roadblocks on the French border. The roadblocks were set up a mile inland in a zigzag pattern, covered by barbed wire entanglements on either side. Nine radio outposts were erected along the German border, with a central receiving station in the St Espirit barracks in the capital.

The line failed significantly to slow the German advance during the invasion of Luxembourg on 10 May 1940. The iron gates were knocked down and ramps were built over the concrete blockades to drive over them; some were blown up.

See also
 K-W Line – a contemporary defense line in Belgium
 Maginot Line – a contemporary defense line in France

References

Further reading
 Nilles, Léon N.: "Die Schusterlinie: Ein Betonklotz gegen die Wehrmacht." In: Lëtzebuerger Journal 53 (2000), Nr. 88 (9. May), pp. 10–11. OCLC 54517360
 Milmeister, Jean: "Sturm auf die "Schusterlinie." In: Letzeburger Sonndesblad 113 (1980), Nr.19, p. 6.

Luxembourg in World War II
World War II defensive lines
Germany–Luxembourg border